Maung Po Tu is one of the 37 nats in the Burmese pantheon of nats. He was a tea trader during the reign of King Minkhaung I of Ava, and he was killed by a tiger on his way to Shan State. He is portrayed sitting on a tiger, a stick in his right hand, and his left hand on his thigh. Maung Po Tu is considered the guardian of traders and their businesses.

References

21
Deaths due to tiger attacks